is a Japanese racing driver currently competing in the FIA Formula 2 Championship with DAMS. He previously raced in the FIA Formula 3 Championship with Hitech Grand Prix. He is a member of the Red Bull Junior Team and the 2020 French F4 champion.

Career

Karting 
Iwasa started karting in Japan in 2005 and began racing competitively in 2014. Some of his notable campaigns were winning the 2014 Suzuka Karting Championship Yamaha-SS Class and becoming champion of the Suzuka Karting Championship x-30 class. Iwasa also competed in the JAF Junior Karting Championship FP in the junior class during his karting career.

Lower formulae

F4 Japanese Championship 
Iwasa made his single-seater debut in 2017 in the F4 Japanese Championship competing in two races for B-Max Racing, finishing 15th in both of them. That year he also took part in two races of the Asian Formula Renault Series. He took pole for both races and finished both races in second place. In 2018 he made another cameo appearance in Japanese F4, driving for Rn-Sports, as he scored points in the first race. In that year Iwasa also finished third in the final round of the JAF F4 Suzuka series. 

Iwasa did his first full season of car racing in the Suzuka Racing School's Single Seater Series in 2019, where he won the title.

French F4 Championship 
In 2020, he was made a Honda Junior Driver and was signed to race in the French F4 Championship. Iwasa won two of three races during the first round, Despite not winning during the next round in Circuit de Nevers Magny-Cours, he would win two races in every round for the next three rounds. Iwasa wrapped up the title with three races still to run by taking a double pole during the final round at the Circuit Paul Ricard. Overall, the Japanese driver took five pole positions, nine wins and 15 podium finishes whilst also claiming a podium in every round and placing no lower than sixth in every race.

F3 Asian Championship 
At the start of 2021 Iwasa competed in the F3 Asian Championship, partnering Roy Nissany, Roman Staněk and Reece Ushijima. He scored his only podium of the campaign in the first race of the fourth round at the Dubai Autodrome and ended up eighth in the championship. Following the championship, Iwasa stated that he needed to "control his psyche".

FIA Formula 3 Championship 

Iwasa's focus for the year would lie in the FIA Formula 3 Championship, where he drove for the same team alongside Stanek and fellow Red Bull Junior Jak Crawford. He had a difficult first round, a poor qualifying saw Iwasa take seventh place and two points during Race 2, in his only points' finish during that weekend. The next round went better for him in Circuit Paul Ricard, he qualified eighth. In Race 1, he jumped two places to third at the start and later made a position on Calan Williams on lap 7, soon passing Logan Sargeant three laps later. However that move would be deemed illegal as he passed the American off-track, and was given a five-second time penalty. Iwasa finished third at the flag and was demoted to eighth. Race 2 saw Iwasa fall from fourth to ninth, while in Race 3 he ended the weekend with more points in seventh. At the Red Bull Ring, Iwasa started 19th in Race 1 and finished ninth, but was disqualified due to disobeying the instruction to pit while being shown the black and orange flag. He recovered to 14th in Race 2, and in a chaotic Race 3 scored points once more in sixth place. 

At the Hungaroring, he qualified tenth. Starting third, he remained in the position until lap 8, where he was up to second following leader Jonny Edgar's retirement. He would finish second behind Lorenzo Colombo, but Colombo would penalised for a safety car infringement, giving Iwasa for his maiden and only F3 win. He would score a tenth and a twelfth place finishes in Race 2 and Race 3 respectively. A difficult round at Spa-Francorchamps, saw Iwasa score no points, but bounced back in Zandvoort with ninth place in qualifying. He achieved his second podium in Race 1, finishing third behind Arthur Leclerc and Logan Sargeant after reverse polesitter Amaury Cordeel spun. In Race 2, Iwasa went off wide and dropped to last, ultimately retiring from the race. He finished 11th in Race 3. In Sochi, Iwasa finished tenth and ninth in Race 1 and Race 3, respectively. The Japanese driver finished the season in twelfth place overall, and fourth among rookies in the series. He also beat both of his teammates in the standings.

FIA Formula 2 Championship

2022 

Iwasa participated in post-season testing in FIA F2 at the Yas Marina circuit with DAMS. On 14 January 2022, the French outfit announced that Iwasa would race for the team during the 2022 season, partnering Roy Nissany. Before his maiden F2 season, Iwasa stated that "he was too safe in F3 and [wanted] to avoid the same mistake in F2".

In Bahrain, having finished second in his first free practice, Iwasa started last as his came to a halt before he could start a lap in qualifying. In the sprint race, he caught the attention of many, as he stormed to his first point in eighth place in an epic drive. In the feature race, Iwasa was up to eighth by lap 11, and was momentarily leading before he made his pit stop. Following a late safety car, Iwasa plummeted down from seventh with a technical issue and eventually ended 16th. In Jeddah he qualified sixth. He finished the sprint race in that position after a battle with both Hitech Grand Prix drivers, and seventh in the feature race.

Iwasa qualified in the top 3 for the first time in Imola, securing second. He narrowly missed points in ninth place during the sprint race, but had a better feature race. He dropped to third at the start but took advantage of the lap 6 safety car by pitting, which costed the other alternate strategy runners. However, he was affected by a double stop, and came out behind numerous cars, but managed to claim sixth place. In Barcelona, he qualified sixth and started fourth in the sprint race (due to polesitter Calan Williams' stall). He jumped Théo Pourchaire and Jake Hughes at the start into second, and secure his maiden podium in F2 by remaining in that position. In the feature race, he was unable to react and unfortunately clipped a slowing Jehan Daruvala which damaged Iwasa's front wing and forced an early pit stop on lap 4, and another on lap 8. Due to his aging tyres, he was unable to hold on to points in the end and finished 12th.

His first non-scoring weekend came at Monaco where Iwasa initially  qualified third. However, his best lap was not abandoned under double-waved yellow flags, and was demoted to start 12th and seventh in the sprint and feature races respectively. In the sprint race, he finished 19th albeit last after he forced Clément Novalak into the wall, earning a ten-second time penalty. While fighting with Williams for tenth in the feature race, he made a failed overtake on him, and collided on the last lap. In Baku, Iwasa qualified 13th as he crashed with ten minutes remaining. Iwasa charged from 13th to eighth in a hectic sprint race. In the feature race, a safety car restart on lap 14 when he the back of Jake Hughes causing front wing damage and a trip to the pits, which eventually yielded 14th place.

In Silverstone, Iwasa qualified sixth. Having sat fifth for the first six laps in the sprint race, he immediately passed Jüri Vips, Daruvala and Enzo Fittipaldi in the next two laps. He was unable to chase Jack Doohan and fell short of a maiden victory by 0.9 seconds. In the feature race, Iwasa had a good getaway at the start, jumping to fourth but a terrible pit stop saw him far from the frontrunners and he finished in 12th. At the Red Bull Ring, Iwasa qualified fourth. In the sprint race, Iwasa forced Logan Sargeant whilst defending and earned a five-second penalty post race. He ended in eighth place, but was demoted to tenth. In the feature race on a drying track, Iwasa opted to start on wet tyres but it did not pay off, instead pitting at the end of lap 7 for dry tyres to the end. He eventually finished in seventh.

He qualified second in Paul Ricard behind Sargeant. He added a point to his tally by scoring sixth place in the sprint race. In the feature race, he passed Sargeant but Doohan both passed him and Iwasa altogether. Despite that, he would re-overtake Doohan for the lead. Iwasa's pace would be superior, taking his maiden win by nearly nine seconds. In Budapest, Iwasa continued his form by taking his first pole by an astonishing four tenths of a second. In the sprint race, he finished eighth from tenth courtesy of the two Prema cars having problems of their own. In the feature race, he dropped to third after being passed by Marcus Armstrong and Pourchaire. However, he was jumped by Enzo Fittipaldi but also jumped Armstrong in the pit stops. He managed to hold on to third place and his fourth podium from a charging Frederik Vesti. Heading into the final four rounds, the Japanese racer sat seventh in the standings with 90 points.

In Spa-Francorchamps, Iwasa qualified 13th. Having finished just outside the points in the sprint race, he bounced back with a feature race with seventh by going on the alternate strategy, which paid off by overtaking many rivals during the end. He qualified fifth in Zandvoort, and finished sixth in the sprint. In the feature race, Iwasa remained fifth at the start, but managed to jump Dennis Hauger in the pit stops. Trouble for Doohan ahead meant that Iwasa could steer for third place.

In Monza, Iwasa qualified seventh however, a chance to improve his lap was interrupted by crashing at the final corner in Parabolica. Starting fourth, Iwasa struggled in the sprint race and slipped back to finish 12th, later being demoted to 16th due to gaining time off-track. In the feature race, Iwasa avoided all chaos and was up in a net second place by lap 11. He was soon overtaken by Frederik Vesti a lap later, and remained in third until the chequered flag. However, Iwasa was disqualified from the race as the plank on his car was below the thickness required. Iwasa took his second pole position at the final round in Yas Marina. After not scoring points in the sprint race, Iwasa duly claimed his second win of the year, despite a late charge from champion Felipe Drugovich. Iwasa ended the season fifth in the standings with 141 points, scored two wins and a total of six podiums. Despite being second highest of all rookies, he was presented with the Anthoine Hubert Award.

2023 
Iwasa is set to continue with DAMS for the 2023 campaign, alongside Ferrari Driver Academy member Arthur Leclerc.

Formula One 
At the beginning of 2021 Iwasa was officially announced as a Red Bull Junior.

Racing record

Racing career summary

Complete F4 Japanese Championship results 
(key) (Races in bold indicate pole position; races in italics indicate points for the fastest lap of top ten finishers)

Complete French F4 Championship results 
(key) (Races in bold indicate pole position) (Races in italics indicate fastest lap)

Complete F3 Asian Championship results 
(key) (Races in bold indicate pole position) (Races in italics indicate the fastest lap of top ten finishers)

Complete FIA Formula 3 Championship results 
(key) (Races in bold indicate pole position; races in italics indicate points for the fastest lap of top ten finishers)

Complete FIA Formula 2 Championship results 
(key) (Races in bold indicate pole position) (Races in italics indicate fastest lap)

References

External links 
 

2001 births
Living people
Japanese racing drivers
FIA Formula 3 Championship drivers
FIA Formula 2 Championship drivers
F3 Asian Championship drivers
Auto Sport Academy drivers
Hitech Grand Prix drivers
DAMS drivers
Sportspeople from Osaka
Asian Formula Renault Challenge drivers
Asia Racing Team drivers
French F4 Championship drivers
Japanese F4 Championship drivers
B-Max Racing drivers